Ian Frederick Banks (born 9 January 1961 in Mexborough, West Riding of Yorkshire) is a former professional footballer who played for Barnsley, Leicester City, Huddersfield Town, Bradford City, West Bromwich Albion, Rotherham United, Darlington and Emley. He has also been a coach including at Chesterfield and former club Bradford City, both alongside Nicky Law. His son Oliver is also a professional footballer.

He was the manager of AFC Emley during the 2008–09 and 2009–10 seasons becoming the first person to be manager of the previous Emley and the current Emley.

External links
 

1961 births
Living people
People from Mexborough
Footballers from Doncaster
English footballers
English football managers
Association football midfielders
English Football League players
Barnsley F.C. players
Leicester City F.C. players
Huddersfield Town A.F.C. players
Bradford City A.F.C. players
West Bromwich Albion F.C. players
Rotherham United F.C. players
Darlington F.C. players
Wakefield F.C. players
Emley A.F.C. players
Bradford City A.F.C. non-playing staff
Wakefield F.C. managers
Emley A.F.C. managers
Eccleshill United F.C. managers